California Citrus State Historic Park is an open-air museum in the state park system of California, United States, interpreting the historic cultural landscape of the citrus industry.  The park’s museum exhibits and interpretive features share the story of the citrus industry's role in the history and development of Southern California, and is told through the experiences of the diverse migrant and immigrant groups who made it all possible. The California Citrus State Historic Park is in the city of Riverside in Riverside County, California, United States.  The  park was established in 1993.

This California State Historic Park reveals the cultural, political, and environmental aspects of the time when "Citrus was King" in California, especially the Navel orange from Riverside, and recognizing the importance of the citrus industry in Southern California.

History
In 1873,  Riverside resident Eliza Tibbets planted two orange trees from the U.S. Department of Agriculture. The success of these trees launched the orange industry in the area.

Open-air museum and visitor center

The design of the park is reminiscent of a 1900s city park, complete with an activity center, interpretive structure, amphitheater, picnic area, and demonstration groves of citrus tree orchards. The land contained within the park still continues to produce high-quality fruits.

The park's visitor center houses a museum about California's citrus industry, and antique citrus grove farm equipment is on display around the park.

In 2002 Huell Howser Productions, in association with KCET/Los Angeles, featured the park in California's Golden Parks; the 28 minute program is available as a VHS videorecording.

See also

 Agricultural Museum (periodical)
 Citrus production
 Citrus greening disease
 Eliza Tibbets - founder of the California citrus industry
 List of food and beverage museums
 Mother Orange Tree
 Orcutt Ranch Horticulture Center
 The Orange Show
 Washington navel orange tree (Riverside, California)

References

External links 
 California Citrus State Historic Park
 

Agriculture museums in the United States
American West museums in California
California State Historic Parks
Citrus
Cultural landscapes
Farm museums in California
Food museums in the United States
Historic districts in California
Industry museums in California
Museums in Riverside, California
Open-air museums in California
Parks in Riverside, California
Protected areas established in 1993
1993 establishments in California